Odetta Sings is a 1970 album by Odetta. It is her only album for the Polydor label.

The album was recorded with many well-known session musicians and special guests, and contained a significant amount of contemporary material. This includes work by Randy Newman, Paul McCartney, James Taylor, Elton John and the Rolling Stones.

Reception

Allmusic stated in their review "Only two songs are written by Odetta herself, "Hit or Miss" and "Movin' It On," which is a shame since they are by far the best tracks of the album. Odetta's deep, dark, warm voice distinguishes her from most soul singers, and these two songs give an idea of what it could have sounded like had she decided to release a real soul album..."

Track listing
"Take Me to the Pilot" (Elton John, Bernie Taupin) – 2:53
"Mama Told Me (Not to Come)" (Randy Newman) – 2:53
"Every Night" (Paul McCartney) – 3:02
"Hit or Miss" (Odetta Gordon) – 2:52
"Give a Damn" (Bob Dorough, Stuart Scharf) – 3:08
"My God and I" (John Buck Wilkin) – 4:28
"Lo and Behold" (James Taylor) – 2:58
"Bless the Children" (Don Cooper) – 2:24
"No Expectations" (Mick Jagger, Keith Richards) – 3:25
"Movin' It On" (Odetta Gordon) – 2:32

Personnel
Odetta – vocals, guitar
Carole King – piano
Barry Beckett – keyboards
Roger Hawkins – drums
John Boylan – rhythm guitar
Jimmy Johnson - rhythm guitar
Russ Kunkel – drums
Bernie Leadon – guitar
Eddie Hinton – lead guitar
David Hood – bass
Merry Clayton – background vocals
Venetta Fields – background vocals
Clydie King – background vocals
Sherlie Matthews – background vocals
Bob West – bass
Jimmie Haskell – strings arrangements
Technical
Herb Cohen - executive producer
Terence Boylan - coordinator 
Henry Diltz - photography

References

Odetta albums
1970 albums
Albums arranged by Jimmie Haskell
Albums produced by John Boylan (record producer)
Albums recorded at Muscle Shoals Sound Studio
Polydor Records albums
Covers albums